Charles Nicholls (5 December 1901 – 14 January 1983) was an Australian cricketer. He played twelve first-class matches for New South Wales between 1925/26 and 1928/29.

See also
 List of New South Wales representative cricketers

References

External links
 

1901 births
1983 deaths
Australian cricketers
New South Wales cricketers
Cricketers from Sydney